The Esplanade Mansion may refer to:

 Esplanade Mansions, Kolkata
 Esplanade Mansion, Mumbai